Lexington Market station is an underground Metro SubwayLink station in Baltimore, Maryland. It is one of 14 stops in the downtown Baltimore area. The station is a transportation hub, a designated transfer station to the Light RailLink  Lexington Market station. The station is also served by a number of bus lines.

Station layout

Artwork

The concrete beams above the station platform are decorated with a ceramic mosaic created by Baltimore artist Patricia Alexander for a commission of $68,300.

Bus connections 
The station has two entrances, one on Lexington Street and one on Saratoga Street. The Lexington Street entrance is located directly across from the main entrance to Lexington Market. The Saratoga Street entrance is a block away, and is located at the stops for bus routes: 
5, 15, 19, 23, 27, 47, 91, 120, 150, 320
Baltimore Light Rail

References

External links 

Baltimore Light Rail and Metro Subway Parking Info
Saratoga Street entrance to Metro Subway from Google Maps Street View
 Lexington Street entrance to Metro Subway from Google Maps Street View

Metro SubwayLink stations
Downtown Baltimore
Railway stations in the United States opened in 1983
1983 establishments in Maryland
Railway stations in Baltimore